Psephis ministralis is a moth in the family Crambidae. It is found in Panama.

References

Moths described in 1914
Glaphyriinae